was a Japanese government official and businessman.

Career
Kabayama received a doctorate in civil law from Yale University in 1893. He was later the Chief of the Cabinet Secretariat of the Second Yamamoto administration (1923-1924). He became a member of the House of Peers in 1924.

References

External links
 National Diet Library, Portraits of Modern Japanese Historical Figures, Kabayama Sukehide

Politicians from Kagoshima Prefecture
1868 births
1941 deaths
Japanese government officials
Yale University alumni
Members of the House of Peers (Japan)
Japanese businesspeople